The 9th Cruiser Squadron  was a formation of cruisers of the Royal Navy from 1912 to 1919 and again from 1939 to 1940. Cruiser squadrons consisted of five to six ships in wartime and in peacetime as low as two to three ships. From 1914 until 1924/25 they were designated as Light Cruiser Squadrons then after 1925 redesignated as Cruiser Squadrons.

First formation
The 9th Cruiser Squadron was first formed in 1912 assigned to the Third Fleet. In August 1914 it was attached to the Channel Fleet. During the war it operated in the North Atlantic and off West Africa, mostly protecting British commerce. It was disbanded in January 1919.

Commanders, first formation
Post holders included:

Reformation and Second World War 
The squadron was reformed from July 1939 to June 1940. It was first attached to the Reserve Fleet, then it came under the command of the Commander-in-Chief, South Atlantic. before being disbanded.

Commodore/Rear-Admiral commanding 
Post holders included:

Notes

References 
 Grove, Eric (2002). German Capital Ships and Raiders in World War II: From Graf Spee to Bismarck, 1931-1941. Hove, East Sussex, England: Psychology Press. 
 Harley, Simon; Lovell, Tony. (2017 "Ninth Cruiser Squadron (Royal Navy)". dreadnoughtproject.org. Harley and Lovell.
 Mackie, Gordon. (2015) "Royal Navy Senior Appointments from 1865" (PDF). gulabin.com. Gordon Mackie.
 Watson, Dr Graham. (2015) "Royal Navy Organisation and Ship Deployments 1900-1914". www.naval-history.net. Gordon Smith.
 Watson, Dr Graham. (2015 "Royal Navy Organisation and Ship Deployment, Inter-War Years 1914-1918: 6. LIST OF SQUADRONS AND FLOTILLAS 1914-1918". www.naval-history.net. Gordon Smith8.

Cruiser squadrons of the Royal Navy
Ship squadrons of the Royal Navy in World War I
Military units and formations disestablished in 1940